The Mifune Group or Mihune Formation is a Mesozoic geologic formation in Japan. It contains dinosaur fossils.

Fossils
Fossils found in the unit include indeterminate dinosaur remains, as well as the turtles Adocus, Shachemys, and Tienfucheloides.

See also

 List of dinosaur-bearing rock formations
 List of stratigraphic units with indeterminate dinosaur fossils

Footnotes

Geologic groups of Asia
Geologic formations of Japan
Cenomanian Stage
Upper Cretaceous Series of Asia
Mesozoic Erathem of Asia